Bitsch is a surname of German origin. Notable people with the surname include:

Emil Bitsch (1916–1944), German Luftwaffe flying ace
Jana Bitsch Messerschidt (born 1990), German karateka
Marcel Bitsch (1921–2011), French composer
Noah Bitsch (born 1989), German karateka

See also
Bitche, a town and commune of the Moselle département, France
Bitsch, a municipality in canton Valais, Switzerland
Bytča, a town in Slovakia

German-language surnames